A Vision: An Explanation of Life Founded upon the Writings of Giraldus and upon Certain Doctrines Attributed to Kusta Ben Luka, privately published in 1925, is a book-length study of various philosophical, historical, astrological, and poetic topics by the Irish poet William Butler Yeats. Yeats wrote this work while experimenting with automatic writing with his wife Georgie Hyde-Lees. It serves as a meditation on the relationships between imagination, history, and the occult. A Vision has been compared to Eureka: A Prose Poem, the final major work of Edgar Allan Poe.

Yeats published a second edition with alterations in 1937.

References

Bibliography 
 Yeats, W. B., A Vision: The Original 1925 Version, ed. Catherine E. Paul and Margaret Mills Harper, Collected Works of W. B. Yeats, Volume XIII. New York: Scribner, 2008. 
 Yeats, W. B., A Vision: The Revised 1937 Version, ed. Catherine E. Paul and Margaret Mills Harper, Collected Works of W. B. Yeats, Volume XIV. New York: Scribner, 2015. 
 Makransky, Bob, The Great Wheel - a commentary on W.B. Yeats' "A Vision". Dear Brutus Press, 2017. 
 Mann, Neil, A Reader's Guide to Yeats's "A Vision". Clemson, SC: Clemson University Press, 2019. 
 Mann, Neil, Matthew Gibson, Claire Nally, Yeats's "A Vision": Explications and Contexts. Clemson, SC: Clemson University Press, 2012. 
 Raine, Kathleen, From Blake to "A Vision". Dublin : Dolmen Press, 1979. 
 Raine, Kathleen, Yeats the initiate : essays on certain themes in the work of W.B. Yeats, Mountrath, Ireland : Dolmen Press ; London : G. Allen & Unwin, 1986. . Cf. Chapter VI, ''From Blake to A Vision", pp. 106–176.

External links
Neil Mann, The System of W. B. Yeats’s A Vision

1925 non-fiction books
Works by W. B. Yeats
Astrological texts
Channelled texts